Leffler is a surname. Notable people with the surname include:

Anne Charlotte Leffler (1849–1892), Swedish author
Edward G. Leffler, salesman who started the first mutual fund
Gösta Mittag-Leffler (1846–1927), Swedish mathematician
Greg Leffler (born 1951), former driver in the CART Championship Car series
Isaac Leffler (1788–1866), represented Virginia's 18th congressional district in the US House of Representatives in the 1820s
Jason Leffler (1975–2013), NASCAR/Indy Car driver from Long Beach, California
John Leffler, former Australian racing driver
John Compton Leffler (1900-1987), Episcopal priest, dean of St. Mark's Cathedral, Seattle (1951-1971)
Marta Leffler (1903–1990), American actress better known as Marta Linden
Melvyn P. Leffler, American historian, and Edward Stettinius Professor of History at the University of Virginia
Samuel J Leffler, computer scientist, known for his extensive work on BSD, from the 1980s to FreeBSD in the present day
Shepherd Leffler (1811–1879), one of the two original U.S. Representatives from Iowa

See also
28394 Mittag-Leffler (1999 RY36) is a main-belt asteroid discovered on September 13, 1999, by P. G. Comba at Prescott
Mittag-Leffler's theorem
Mittag-Leffler function
Mittag-Leffler Institute, mathematical research institute located in Djursholm, a suburb of Stockholm
Mittag-Leffler star of a complex-analytic function is a set in the complex plane obtained by attempting to extend that function along rays emanating from a given point